The 1987–88 Kentucky Wildcats men's basketball team represented University of Kentucky in the 1987–88 NCAA Division I men's basketball season. The head coach was Eddie Sutton and the team finished the season with an overall record of 27–6. However, the team forfeited three of their games to finish 25–5.

Schedule

|-
!colspan=9 style=| Regular season

|-
!colspan=12 style=| SEC tournament

|-
!colspan=12 style=|NCAA tournament

Rankings

References 

Kentucky Wildcats men's basketball seasons
Kentucky
Kentucky
Kentucky Wildcats
Kentucky Wildcats